1910 in philosophy

Events

Publications 
 Lucien Lévy-Bruhl, How Natives Think (1910, published in English in 1926)
Bertrand Russell, Principia Mathematica Volume I

Births 
 October 29 - A. J. Ayer (died 1989)

Deaths 

Philosophy
20th-century philosophy
Philosophy by year